15 Days is a four-part British television miniseries starring David Caves, Catherine Tyldesley, Frances Grey and Bruce Herbelin-Earle. It was broadcast on Channel 5 on four consecutive nights from 13 May to 16 May 2019. The series revolves around a young man who is murdered by his own family; it then rewinds fifteen days to figure out why he was killed.

References

External links
 

2019 British television series debuts
2019 British television series endings
2010s British drama television series
2010s British television miniseries
Channel 5 (British TV channel) original programming
English-language television shows